Shreemati Rayavva Venkanagoudra Patil Government High School (in Kannada: ಶ್ರೀಮತಿ ಆರ್.ವ್ಹಿ.ಪಾಟೀಲ ಸರ್ಕಾರಿ ಪ್ರೌಢಶಾಲೆ ಕಮಡೊಳ್ಳಿ) is situated at Kamadolli, Kundagol Talluk Dharwad District of Karnataka. The school is located near the Lord Basava Temple. It offers secondary education with state government syllabus. It was established in 1983. The land for the school was donated by its namesake. In 2008, it celebrated its Silver Jubilee.

References

Schools in Dharwad district
Educational institutions established in 1983